Jesse James Rutherford (born August 21, 1991) is an American singer, songwriter, and former actor. He is the lead vocalist of the alternative rock band the Neighbourhood. Alongside his bandmates, Rutherford wrote the number-one Billboard Alternative Songs hit "Sweater Weather", which was certified nine-times platinum in the US in 2022.

Early life and career beginnings 

Rutherford was born in Newbury Park, California, on August 21, 1991. Since he was young, he has been involved in the entertainment industry; as a child, he used to perform in talent shows where he impersonated N'Sync members and Elvis Presley. This passion to perform would lead Rutherford to work in television commercials (such as Hallmark) and in films and television projects such as his role in the 2002 film Life or Something Like It, followed by another role in the 2002 film Bundy. In 2002, Rutherford had also a small television role in the Star Trek: Enterprise episode Marauders. Throughout his teen years, he was the lead vocalist of multiple local bands.

Career

His first solo project was released in 2011 with a mixtape named "Truth Hurts, Truth Heals". Rutherford combines hip-hop and R&B influences to create the 17 song album. In the same year, Rutherford was connecting with other local musicians when the idea of forming a new band came up. The genre-blending pop group the Neighbourhood was created soon after, presenting a mix of atmospheric indie rock, electronica, and hip-hop beats with melodic, R&B-influenced vocals. In 2012, the band released its first song "Female Robbery" which was followed by "Sweater Weather" off of their debut studio album "I Love You.". "Sweater Weather" was a radio hit which reached number one on the Billboard Alternative Songs chart in June 2013. With The Neighbourhood, Rutherford played in several festivals like Lollapalooza (2013) and Coachella (2013 and 2018).

In early 2016, Rutherford released his 144-page book, "&". It features pictures of himself, shot by Jessie English, that explores gender fluidity. Rutherford stated that he used clothes from his own closet, and he shot until he ran out of clothes.

In the same year, Rutherford branched out and began releasing songs on Soundcloud under the name "the Factoury." On November 10, 2017, Rutherford released his debut solo studio album, "&", containing 11 tracks with no features. It was previously announced on November 3, through an article from Pigeons & Planes.  On December 17, 2018, Jesse announced that he was going on his first solo tour in 2019.

On April 2, 2019, Jesse announced a second solo album called "GARAGEB&", along with its album cover and the tracklist. The album was officially released on April 12, 2019. The album's name is inspired by Jesse's rediscovery of his love for writing music as he was trying to fight his dependency on his phone and social media. Instead of using his phone to check his social media, he started using the GarageBand app to make music. Ten out of the album's 12 tracks were made on the app.

Personal life 
Rutherford grew up with a strong interest in wearing different clothes and mixed-styles. He used to work at several clothing stores and used to change clothes five times a day during his younger days. His capability of combining multi-gender styles with designer gear pulls out his creativity in this matter.

Beginning in 2015, Rutherford was in a relationship with Devon Lee Carlson, model and co-founder of Wildflower Cases. Together, they were elected "2019's most 2019 couple" by GQ. In 2020, they collaborated with Marc Jacobs to create a Valentine's Day limited-edition T-shirt. It sold out within minutes. In November 2021, multiple sources claimed the couple had split after 6 years of dating. The breakup was confirmed by Carlson in September 2022 on the Call Her Daddy podcast.

Since October 2022, Rutherford has been in a relationship with fellow singer Billie Eilish. The couple has faced some backlash since making their relationship public due to their 10 year age gap. In order to poke fun at the backlash the couple wore a couples costume where Eilish dressed as a baby and Rutherford as an old man

Filmography

Discography

References

External links

1991 births
21st-century American male actors
21st-century American singers
American male film actors
Male actors from California
American rock singers
Singers from California
Living people
People from Newbury Park, California